Tabernaemontana contorta is a species of plant in the family Apocynaceae. It is found in Cameroon.

References

contorta